La Corte del Pueblo (translated The People's Court) is a Spanish-language reality court show that originally aired on KWHY-TV in Los Angeles but later moved to Telemundo. The show was presided over by Cristina Pérez in its first season. When the show moved to Telemundo, Los Angeles-based lawyer Manuel Franco took over the bench. The show ran for five seasons starting in 1999 and ending its run in 2005, when Franco left the show due to a conflict with Telemundo regarding his views on the Latin American community.

See also
 Caso Cerrado
 Judge Judy

References

External links

Telemundo original programming
1999 American television series debuts
2005 American television series endings
Court shows